Riyad al-Maliki (born 31 May 1955) is former Minister of Information, government spokesperson, and Foreign Affairs Minister of the Palestinian National Authority in its 12th government, and resumed office as Foreign Affairs Minister in the current 13th government.

Biography
He was born on 31 May 1955 in Tulkarm, and earned a bachelor's degree in civil engineering from Pontifical Xavierian University in Colombia in 1978 and a PhD in civil engineering at the American University.

He was formally a lecturer in Birzeit University and was a leading member of the Popular Front for the Liberation of Palestine. He was head and founder of Panorama, the Palestinian Center for the Dissemination of Democracy and Community Development, an active non-governmental organization in the Palestinian civil society. He worked at the engineering department at Birzeit University in 1978 and he became Head of the Civil Engineering Department in the university. He got awarded the European Peace Prize in 2000 in Copenhagen and the Italian Peace Prize (Lombardi) in 2005. He is the coordinator of the Arab Program to Support and Develop Democracy, which is an alliance of more than 12 civil society institutions. Visiting professor in several European universities.

In 2007, al-Maliki was one of three government ministers who investigated the circumstances of Palestinians who were stranded on the Egyptian side of the border along the Gaza Strip, because the only border crossing available to them was Israeli-controlled and they feared interrogation or arrest.

Upon the report to United Nations from palestine, regarding injustice and oppression of Israel from his foreign office, His VIP travel card was confiscated by Israeli border security as per the instructions of Benjamin Netanyahu.

See also
List of foreign ministers in 2017
List of current foreign ministers

References

External links

1955 births
Living people
People from Tulkarm
Pontifical Xavierian University alumni
American University alumni
Popular Front for the Liberation of Palestine members
Academic staff of Birzeit University
Foreign ministers of the Palestinian National Authority
Government ministers of the Palestinian National Authority
Government ministers of the State of Palestine
Palestinian civil engineers
20th-century engineers